Madalyn Godby  (born September 5, 1992) is an American female track cyclist, representing the United States at international competitions. Godby is the current U.S. women's national record holder in the flying 200m (10.555), standing 250m (19.398), and team sprint (33.353).

Career 
Her notable wins include women’s keirin at the World Cup in Milton during the 2018–19 season and women’s keirin at the World Cup in Santiago during the 2017–18 season.

She has qualified to represent the United States at the 2020 Summer Olympics.

Career Results

2013
Challenge International sur piste
1st Keirin
1st Sprint
Los Angeles Grand Prix
2nd Team Sprint (Alissa Maglaty)
3rd Sprint 
2015
2nd Sprint, International Belgian Open
3rd Keirin, Grand Prix of Colorado Springs
3rd Sprint, Champions of Sprint
2016
3rd  Team Sprint, Pan American Track Championships (with Mandy Marquardt)
2017
Easter International Grand Prix
1st Keirin
3rd Sprint 
1st Team Sprint, Fastest Man on Wheels (with Mandy Marquardt)
2018
USA Cycling National Track Championships
1st Sprint
1st Keirin
2nd Team Sprint (with Paige Gray)
2018–19
Tissot UCI Track Cycling World Cup Milton
1st Keirin

References

External links

Maddie Godby at USA Cycling

1992 births
Living people
American female cyclists
American track cyclists
Sportspeople from Boulder, Colorado
Cyclists at the 2020 Summer Olympics
Olympic cyclists of the United States
21st-century American women